Eupithecia nepalata is a moth in the family Geometridae. It is found in Afghanistan, Tajikistan, northern Pakistan, northern India and Nepal. The habitat consists of mountainous areas.

References

Moths described in 1961
nepalata
Moths of Asia